= Cambodia national football team results =

This article details with official and unofficial match in fixtures and results of the Cambodia national football team.
